The Wieda is a river in the German states of Lower Saxony and Thuringia.

Its channel regularly dries up in the summer months - it sinks into the karst soil and reappears in other places as springs. Its most important tributary is the Uffe.

See also 
List of rivers of Lower Saxony
List of rivers of Thuringia

References 

Rivers of Lower Saxony
Rivers of Thuringia
Rivers of the Harz
Rivers of Germany